Fathabad (also known as Fatḩābād-e Golshan and Fathābād-e Golshan) is a village in Kahduiyeh Rural District, Nir District, Taft County, Yazd Province, Iran. At the 2006 census, its population was 47, in 15 families.

References 

Populated places in Taft County